SU Cygni is a triple star system in the northern constellation of Cygnus, abbreviated SU Cyg. The primary component of the system is a classical Cepheid variable with a period of 3.8455473 days. The changing luminosity of this star causes the system to vary in brightness from a peak apparent visual magnitude of 6.44 down to magnitude 7.22 over the course of its cycle. The distance to this system is approximately 3,200 light years based on parallax measurements. It is a member of the Turner 9 open cluster of stars.

The variable luminosity of this star was announced by G. Müller and G. Kempf in 1898. The following year, M. Luizet determined a period of 3.846 days. In 1906, the radial velocity of this star was found to be variable by J. D. Maddrill, with its cycle matching the luminosity period but trailing in phase by half a day. By 1916 it was classified as a Cepheid variable, with spectrographic studies showing that the spectral type varied over the course of each cycle. It ranged from a class of A6 near peak luminosity down to F7 at minimum.

A companion star, designated component B, was detected photometrically by B. F. Madore in 1977, with the colors suggesting a B-type main-sequence star with a class of B6–7V. This finding was supported by observations of J. D. Fernie in 1979, who determined a class of B6V. In 1984, M. Imbert measured an orbital period of 549.2 days for the pair, with an orbital eccentricity (ovalness) of 0.35. Ultraviolet observations with the IUE spacecraft in 1985 showed that the companion is a close binary system with a period of 4.7 days. The members of this pair have classes of B8 and A0. In 1998, the B-type companion was found to be a chemically peculiar HgMn star.

It is an A-type main-sequence star with a class of A2V. This star does not appear to be gravitationally bound to SU Cyg.

References

Further reading

F-type supergiants
Classical Cepheid variables
B-type main-sequence stars
A-type main-sequence stars
Mercury-manganese stars
Triple star systems

Cygnus (constellation)
7518
Durchmusterung objects
186688
97150
Cygni, SU